is a Japanese seinen manga magazine published by Shueisha. Launched in 1979, it is published under Shueisha's Jump line of magazines. The chapters of series that run in Weekly Young Jump are collected and published in tankōbon volumes under the "Young Jump Comics" imprint every four months. Many of the featured series are known to contain heavy violence and a fair amount of sexual content. The magazine is headquartered in Tokyo.

History
Young Jump was launched in May 1979 as biweekly magazine and switched to a weekly release schedule in 1981. The "young" in its name denotes its target demographic as a seinen manga magazine, aimed at young adult men. In 2008, an offshoot issue similar to Monthly Shōnen Jump was released called Monthly Young Jump; the magazine was rebranded as Miracle Jump in 2011, and was suspended in 2017.

A spin-off website, titled , debuted on June 14, 2012, starting with Yusuke Murata's remake of One's series One-Punch Man.

Features

Series
There are currently twenty-eight manga titles being regularly serialized in Weekly Young Jump. Out of twenty-eight series, one series is serialized monthly and two series are on hiatus.

Former series

1970s–1980s
 by Kazuo Koike (story) and Go Nagai (art) (1979–1982) 
 by Kentarō Yano (1982–1985)
 by Hikaru Yuzuki (1982–1987)
 by Kazuo Koike (story) and Noriyoshi Inoue (art) (1985–1991)
 by Makoto Ogino (1985–1989)
 by Toshio Nobe (1986–1996)
Nineteen 19 by Shō Kitagawa (1988–1990)
 by Hiromi Morishita (1988–1994)
 by Hiroya Oku (1989–1995)

1990s
 by Makoto Ogino (1990–1992)
 by Go Nagai (1991–1992)
Hen by Hiroya Oku (1992–1997)
Kirara by Toshiki Yui (1993–1997)
 by Tetsuya Saruwatari (1993–2003)
 by Sakura Takeuchi (1994–1997)
 by Hiroshi Motomiya (1994–2002)
 (1995–1997)
Colorful by Torajirō Kishi (1997–2000)
 by Sho Kitagawa (1997–2000)
 by Kazuhiro Kumagai (1997–2002)

2000s
ComaGoma by Hiromi Morishita (2000–2004)
Gantz by Hiroya Oku (2000–2013)
Arcana by Yua Kotegawa (2000–2001)
 by Yōichi Takahashi (2000–2004)
 by Kazuki Funatsu (2001–2012)
 by Tsutomu Takahashi (2001–2002)
 by Hiyoko Kobayashi (2001–2007)
 by Lynn Okamoto (2002–2005)
Blue Heaven by Tsutomu Takahashi (2002)
Zetman by Masakazu Katsura (2002–2014)
 by Tsutomu Takahashi (2003)
 by Yūgo Ishikawa (2003–2010)
Tough by Tetsuya Saruwatari (2003–2012)
 by Masaya Hokazono (story) and Court Betten (art) (2003–2007)
 by Tsutomu Takahashi (2003–2004)
 by Yōko Sanri (2004–2011)
 by Yukiya Sakuragi (2004–2009) — Transferred to Monthly Young Jump
Liar Game by Shinobu Kaitani (2005–2015)
 by Yōzaburō Kanari (story) and Kuroko Yabuguchi (art) (2005–2007)
 by Yōichi Takahashi (2005–2008)
 by Makoto Ogino (2006–2009) — Transferred to Monthly Young Jump
 by Toshio Sako (2006–2017)
 by Tooru Fujisawa (2006–2007)
 by Hiroya Oku (2006–2007)
 by Yokusaru Shibata (2006–2014)
 by Masanori Morita (2007–2019) — Transferred from Weekly Shōnen Jump
 by Shion Miura (original story) and Sorata Unno (art) (2007–2009)
 by Lynn Okamoto (2007–2010)
 by Yoshirō Nabeda (story) and Shin-ichi Sakamoto (story and art) (2007–2011)
 by Peach-Pit (2008–2014)
 by Hiroshi Motomiya (2009–2011)
 by Yōichi Takahashi (2009–2012)
Jiya by Akira Toriyama (story) and Masakazu Katsura (art) (2009–2010)

2010s
 by NON (2010–2012)
 by Katsumasa Enokiya (2010–2015)
 by Yōichi Takahashi (2010–2012)
 by Kouji Mori (2010–2016)
 by Yasu Tora (2011–2014)
 by Satoru Noda (2011–2012)
 by Sui Ishida (2011–2014)
 by Minori Inaba (2011–2019)
 by Tomohiro Matsu (story) and Miyano Hirotsugu (art) (2011–2012)
 by Tsutomu Takahashi (2011–2013)
 by Lynn Okamoto (story) and Mengo Yokoyari (art) (2012–2017)
 by Lynn Okamoto (2012–2016)
 by Shin-ichi Sakamoto (2013–2015)
 by Sankaku Head (2013–2017)
 by Tooru Fujisawa (2013–2014)
 by Masaki Kasahara (2013–2017)
 by Yukino Kitajima (story) and Yūki Kodama (art) (2013–2014)
 by Akira Sugito (2013–2016)
All You Need Is Kill by Hiroshi Sakurazaka (original story), Ryōsuke Takeuchi (story) and Takeshi Obata (art) (2014)
 by Kazuki Funatsu (2014–2017)
 by Satoru Noda (2014–2022)
 by Sui Ishida (2014–2018)
87 Clockers by Tomoko Ninomiya (2014–2016) — Transferred from Jump X
 by Taku Sakamoto (2015–2018) — Transferred from Miracle Jump
 by Tetsuya Tsutsui (story) and Fumio Obata (art) (2015) — Transferred from Jump X
 by Kakeru Sato (2015–2016)
 by Yoshiki Tanaka (original story) and Ryu Fujisaki (art) (2015–2020) — Transferred to Ultra Jump
 by Aka Akasaka (2016–2022) — Transferred from Miracle Jump
 by Yūma Kagami (2016–2017)
 by Hikaru Nakamura (2016–2019) — Transferred to Ultra Jump
 by Osamu Akimoto (2017–2018)
 by Sankaku Head (2017–2018)
 by Ryu Fujisaki (2018)
 by Masaki Kasahara (2018–2020)
 by Koyuri Noguchi (2019–2020)
 by Nene Yukimori (2019–2023)

2020s
 by Masaki Kasahara (2021–2022)
 by Sui Ishida (2021–2022) — Parallel publication on Tonari no Young Jump

Special issues

Miracle Jump 
 is a spin-off issue of Weekly Young Jump, first published in January 2011. It includes one shots and Weekly Young Jump series' side stories, and a series that only serializes in Miracle Jump. Initially, it was scheduled to release bimonthly until June 25, 2013. From April 15, 2014, it was changed into monthly releases, and the number of serialization has increased ever since.

Young Jump Gold 
 is a spin-off issue of Weekly Young Jump, first published on July, 2017. It includes one shots and Weekly Young Jump series' side stories.

Young Jump Battle 
Shueisha launched a spin-off magazine called Young Jump Battle in October 2019. It focuses on manga from the battle manga genre. The first issue will have five one-shots from Young Jump mangaka.

Young Jump Love 
A spin-off focused on romance manga called Young Jump Love launched on winter 2020.

Circulation

References

External links
  
 

1979 establishments in Japan
Magazines established in 1979
Magazines published in Tokyo
Seinen manga magazines
Shueisha magazines
Weekly manga magazines published in Japan